F13, F 13, F.13 or F-13 may refer to:

 F 13 Norrköping, a former Swedish Air Force wing 
 F-13 Superfortress, B-29 Superfortress bombers modified for photographic recon duties
 Junkers F.13, the world's first all-metal airliner
 LSWR F13 class, a 1905 British 4-6-0 steam locomotive model
 Florencia 13, a Hispanic gang in Los Angeles
 Fluorine-13 (F-13 or 13F), an isotope of fluorine
 Stephen King's F13, a video game
 f13, Family 13, a group of Greek gospel manuscripts
 Friday the 13th, which is considered an unlucky day in Western superstition
 Friday the 13th (franchise), a series of horror films
 Triskaidekaphobia, the fear of the number 13
 a function key labeled F13 on some computer keyboards
 the ICD-10 code for Mental and behavioural disorders due to use of sedatives or hypnotics
 a third generation BMW 6 Series coupe
 Samsung Galaxy F13, an Android-based smartphone manufactured by Samsung Electronics.